William Clyburn, Sr. (born May 19, 1941) is an American politician. He is a member of the South Carolina House of Representatives from the 82nd District, serving since 1995. He is a member of the Democratic party.  Clyburn earned degrees from Allen University in 1964 and the University of South Carolina (M.Ed., 1975)  He is a cousin of Jim Clyburn.

References

External links

Living people
1941 births
African-American state legislators in South Carolina
Democratic Party members of the South Carolina House of Representatives
21st-century American politicians
21st-century African-American politicians
20th-century African-American people
Clyburn family